The Premier Basketball League, often abbreviated to the PBL, is an American professional men's basketball minor league that began play in January 2008. The league folded after the 2017 season. It was announced that the league would be revived under new management for the 2020 season. The league announced due coronavirus outbreak the season would be put on hold.

History

2008 season 
The PBL was formed after a number of disagreements between several former member teams of the modern American Basketball Association (ABA) and ABA CEO Joe Newman.  Eight of the initial ten PBL teams either played in or were slated to play in the ABA.

In early 2007, Newman was voted out of his position as CEO of the ABA by the board of directors, which included Maryland Nighthawks owner and then-ABA COO Tom Doyle (who was later a commissioner of the PBL), citing dissatisfaction with how Newman executed his duties as CEO, the large number of ABA teams that did not have the funds to operate, and high number of games when an ABA team did not show up. Newman responded by using his and other shares that formed a controlling interest to remove the entire board of directors.

Newman then refused to reschedule a weather-delayed playoff game between the Rochester RazorSharks and Wilmington Sea Dawgs although the two teams agreed to a make up date, wanting instead to force Rochester to accept a forfeit. It was on the heels of these two incidents that the Nighthawks and RazorSharks ownership groups decided to found the PBL. Dr. Sev Hrywnak, owner of the Rochester RazorSharks, invested close to $2 million to start the PBL. The business model was structured so that teams entering the initial season did not have to pay an entrance fee of $100,000 and that all travel would be covered by the League. This would allow new teams the opportunity to have financial success from the start.

Former Houston Rockets point guard and current NBA on TNT analyst Kenny Smith was the league's first commissioner.

2009 season 
During the 2008 off season, six more former ABA teams decided to move to the PBL. First, on May 9, the Manchester Millrats and the 2006–2007 and 2007–2008 ABA champion Vermont Frost Heaves moved. Then on May 20, the inactive Detroit Panthers re-activated and joined the league. And on May 21, the Quebec Kebs joined. On June 5 another team with an ABA history, the Augusta Groove, joined the league, but from the Continental Basketball Association. On June 23, the Halifax Rainmen, an ABA team the previous year, announced they were also joining the PBL. The first International Basketball League defection came on July 31 when the Battle Creek Knights joined the league. The Rochester RazorSharks went on to win their second straight PBL title after beating the Battle Creek Knights.

2010 season 
The Battle Creek Knights, the Wilmington Sea Dawgs and the Lawton-Fort Sill Cavalry would not return for the 2010 season. The Maryland Nighthawks changed the name of their franchise to the Maryland GreenHawks. The Puerto Rico Capitanes joined the league, performing concurrently in the Baloncesto Superior Nacional.

At the end of the season, the league officially severed ties with the Buffalo Stampede, citing a failure by the team to adhere to league standards. The Maryland GreenHawks were also dropped from the league.  The Bluegrass Stallions, another ABA team located in Kentucky, joined.  The league also added the expansion Dayton Air Strikers.

2011 season 
In January, the Vermont Frost Heaves abruptly announced the cessation of operations and their players were dispersed via a draft. The Rochester RazorSharks won the league championship.

2012 season 
The league approved expansion teams in Chicago and Scranton, Pennsylvania for the 2012 PBL season. Also, Chattanooga, Tennessee, Hershey, Pennsylvania, and Madison, Wisconsin were named as cities pending approval for expansion teams.

On 18 July 2011, the PBL announced the Dayton Air Strikers were returning to the league for the 2012 season.  In addition, the Northwestern Illinois-based Sauk Valley Predators began their inaugural season in the PBL for 2012.  On August 22, 2011, it was announced the Charleston Gunners would be the PBL's sixth team for the 2012 season.  On September 15, 2011, it was announced the Northwest Indiana Stars were leaving the ABA to be the PBL's seventh team for the 2012 season.  On 21 September 2011 it was announced the Lake Michigan Admirals were also leaving the ABA to be the PBL's eighth team for the 2012 season. On 23 September 2011 it was announced that the PBL's ninth team for the 2012 season would be the Central Illinois Drive based in Bloomington, Illinois.  On October 12, 2011, it was announced that the Indiana Diesels were also leaving the ABA to be the PBL's tenth team for the 2012 season.  On October 14, 2011, it was announced that the St. Louis Pioneers were also leaving the ABA to join the PBL, changing their name to the St. Louis Phoenix.

The Central Illinois Drive won the PBL championship for 2012, defeating the Rochester RazorSharks, 101-80. The Drive was 18-1 in regular season and 22-1 total.

2013 season 
During the off season the league announced it would be merging with the Independent Basketball Association to form the IBA-PBL. Prior to the start of the season, the defending champions, the Central Illinois Drive, ceased operations, but were then rebooted as the Bloomington Flex.

On 24 May 2013, the six PBL teams announced that the two leagues would cease interleague play, and that the leagues would hold separate playoffs. In the first round of the PBL playoffs, the Bloomington Flex beat the Indiana Diesels two games to none, and the Rochester RazorSharks beat the Sauk Valley Predators two games to none.  In the finals, the Flex beat the RazorSharks two games to none to win their second consecutive title.

On 21 September 2013, the PBL announced the first of what is expected to be up to six expansion teams, with the Lima Express signing to play for the 2014 season, which will begin in January.

On 12 November 2013, the PBL announced the addition of the Pee Dee Vipers, an expansion team based in Florence, South Carolina. Three days later, the league announced that the Lake Michigan Admirals would return for 2014. On November 25, the PBL announced the addition of the Buffalo 716ers and the Erie Hurricane. In late November the Chicago Tide joined the league.

On 6 February 2014, it was announced that the newly formed Grand Rapids Cyclones would join the PBL.

2014 season 
Championship Series (Best 2 of 3)

Indiana Diesels (2) vs Rochester RazorSharks (1)

Rochester wins PBL Championship series 2 games to 1

2015 season

Several games in the 2015 season had to be postponed due to winter weather, leading to a rescheduling of games in March to ascertain that every team in the league would have played at least 15 games before the playoffs. The best-of-three finals-only playoffs between Midwest Division Champions Lake Michigan Admirals and East Division Champions Rochester RazorSharks opened on March 21 in Waterlivet, Michigan, with game two set for March 28 in Rochester. The Rochester RazorSharks won the 2015 PBL Championship, winning the first two games in a best-of three series against the Lake Michigan Admirals.

Championship Series (Best 2 of 3)

Lake Michigan Admirals (2) vs Rochester RazorSharks (1)

Rochester wins PBL Championship series 2 games to 0

2016 season
Many new franchise additions occurred in the 2015 off-season including the Jamestown Jackals, Kentucky Mavericks, Western New York Thundersnow, and the return of the Danville Riverhawks. Mavericks owner Jerry Nelson also become an equity partner in the PBL. In addition, the PBL gained a new Southeast Conference which includes six members of the Tobacco Road Basketball League: Cary Invasion, Charlotte Elite, Durham Legacy, Huntersville HoopForLyfe, Raleigh Revolt, and the Wilmington Sea Dawgs.

Championship Series (Best 2 of 3)

Lake Michigan Admirals (3) vs Rochester RazorSharks (1)

Rochester wins PBL Championship series 2 games to 0

2017 season
Championship Series (Best 2 of 3)

Kentucky Mavericks (2) vs Rochester RazorSharks (1)

Rochester wins PBL Championship series 2 games to 1

Teams

Future Teams

History of teams

Champions

Awards

Sixth Man of the Year 
 2009: Alex Harper, Wilmington Sea Dawgs
 2010: Melvin Council, Rochester RazorSharks
 2011: Eddie Smith, Lawton-Fort Sill Cavalry
 2012: Rodney Edgerson, Central Illinois Drive
 2013: Darin Mency, Rochester RazorSharks
 2014: John Hart, Indianapolis Diesels
 2015: Kyle Meyer, Lima Express
 2016: Melvin Council, Rochester RazorSharks

Defensive Player of the Year 
 2009: Jonas Pierre, Quebec Kebs and Al Stewart, Manchester Millrats
 2010: Eric Crookshank, Halifax Rainmen
 2011: Eric Crookshank, Halifax Rainmen
 2012: Marcel Anderson, Chicago Muscle
 2013: Nate Fuqua, Bloomington Flex
 2014: Courtney Blackmore, Lake Michigan Admirals
 2015: Troy Franklin, Lake Michigan Admirals

Rookie of the Year 
 2010: Eric Gilchrese, Manchester Millrats & Halifax Rainmen
 2011: Todd McCoy, Rochester RazorSharks
 2012: 
 2013: Josiah Whitehead, Bloomington Flex
 2014: Jamaal Francis, Lynchburg Titans
 2015: Josh Chichester, Grand Rapids Cyclones
 2016: Michael Davenport, Jamestown Jackals

References

External links 
 

 
Professional sports leagues in the United States
Basketball leagues in the United States
2007 establishments in the United States
Sports leagues established in 2007